Streptomyces yokosukanensis is a bacterium species from the genus of Streptomyces which has been isolated from soil in Japan. Streptomyces yokosukanensis produces neburalin.

See also 
 List of Streptomyces species

References

Further reading

External links
Type strain of Streptomyces yokosukanensis at BacDive – the Bacterial Diversity Metadatabase

yokosukanensis
Bacteria described in 1961